The derby of the eternal rivals, also called mother of all battles (Greek: μητέρα των μαχών), is a football local derby in the Athens urban area (Athens/Piraeus) between the most successful clubs of Greece, Olympiacos and Panathinaikos. The rivalry between the clubs and their fans is intense, thus this derby has always been a classic for the Greek capital, as well as the whole of Greece, the most prestigious in the country. The derby is traditionally included among the world's top 10 greatest football derbies by the international media, along with rivalries such as Real Madrid–Barcelona, Liverpool–Manchester United and Boca Juniors–River Plate. American network CNN has ranked the Olympiacos–Panathinaikos derby among the ten greatest football rivalries of all-time. In October 2014, BBC named the Olympiacos–Panathinaikos derby as "Europe's maddest derby" and in September 2019, Daily Mirror ranked the derby of the eternal enemies as the fifth most important derby in the world. In 2019, GOAL, one of the biggest football sites in the world had a special article about the Greek derby. The GOAL marked Panathinaikos as the most successful Greek club in Europe and Olympiacos as the most successful club in Greek League.

History

Cultural rivalry

The rivalry between the two top Greek clubs can be traced back to some social, cultural and regional differences. Panathinaikos, founded in 1908, comes from the centre of Athens and was considered the classic representative of the high class and old Athenian society of the Greek capital. On the other hand, Olympiacos was founded in 1925 and comes from Piraeus, the port city just on the outskirts of Athens, thus attracting supporters from the surrounding working class areas. Both cities have played a major role in Greek history since classical antiquity; Athens was regarded as the cradle of the ancient Greek civilization, taking advantage of Piraeus' strategic potential and forming a unified region with the latter. During the 20th century, Athens experienced a demographic explosion and territorial expansion coming to enclose all its suburbs, including Piraeus, in a large urban area.

These class differences between the people in the homelands of the two clubs offered further reasons for the animosity between their fans. Olympiacos' early success provided a way for the people of Piraeus to express their contempt for the wealthier classes, by which Panathinaikos was heavily supported. Furthermore, Olympiacos attracted fans from all over Greece who believed themselves to be victims of social and political unfairness. However, this kind of clash was much more pronounced in the past, as the class differences between the fanbases have faded out and the social gap that once separated the two sides has closed over the years. Nowadays, both clubs boast fanbases that represent all the social classes.

Fans' rivalry
Olympiacos and Panathinaikos are the most popular Greek clubs, with both sides having large fanbases that follow them in domestic and international matches. Football hooliganism is a very common phenomenon between their fans in recent years, featuring anything from breaking seats, fighting, fireworks and street rioting. The hatred is so intense that many violent incidents have taken place in several regions of Athens, especially before or after a derby. On 29 March 2007, Mihalis Filopoulos, a 22-year-old Panathinaikos fan, was stabbed to death at Paiania, a town close to Athens where a women's volleyball game between Olympiacos and Panathinaikos was scheduled to take place that day, during a pre-arranged clash between hooligans of the two clubs. That incident caused major upset in Greece and sparked a large police investigation into the organized supporters scene, while all team sport events in Greece were suspended for two weeks.

Football rivalry
Both clubs compete with each other for the title of the most successful football club in the country, as well as the greatest Greek sports club overall. Their football departments have always been the most attractive among their fans and they have a long-standing antagonism since they first met in the fields, but the rivalry also extends into other team sports such as basketball, volleyball and water polo. Domestically, Olympiacos is the most successful football club in Greece, having won a record 79 major official titles compared to Panathinaikos' 42 titles and also being the most successful in their head-to-head fixtures. On the other hand, Panathinaikos boast of their better performance in European competitions (no Greek team has ever won a European title). Their greatest success is the participation in the European Cup final in 1971, two semifinal appearances in the UEFA Champions League (1985, 1996) and four quarterfinal appearances in the UEFA Champions League (1992, 2002) and UEFA Europa League (1988,2003) as well, while Olympiacos' best performances are their campaign to the quarterfinals of the UEFA Champions League in 1999 and their campaign to the quarterfinals of the 1992–93 European Cup Winners' Cup

Statistics

Head-to-head

Records
Record win of the pre Alpha Ethniki era
Olympiacos: 
Home: Olympiacos – Panathinaikos 6–1, Neo Phaliron Velodrome, 16 February 1936
Away: Panathinaikos – Olympiacos 0–3, Apostolos Nikolaidis Stadium, 7 May 1939
Panathinaikos: 
Home: Panathinaikos – Olympiacos 8–2, Apostolos Nikolaidis Stadium, 1 June 1930
Away: Olympiacos – Panathinaikos 1–4, Karaiskakis Stadium, 3 March 1940
Record Alpha Ethniki win
Olympiacos
Home: Olympiacos – Panathinaikos 4–0, Karaiskakis Stadium, 26 February 1967
Away: Panathinaikos – Olympiacos 1–4, Leoforos Alexandras Stadium, 16 May 2021
Panathinaikos
Home: Panathinaikos – Olympiacos 3–0, Athens Olympic Stadium, 26 January 1992
Away: Olympiacos – Panathinaikos 1–4, Karaiskakis Stadium, 24 July 1960 , Olympiacos – Panathinaikos 1–4, Athens Olympic Stadium, 8 November 1987 and Olympiacos – Panathinaikos 0–3, Karaiskakis Stadium, 2 March 2014
Record Greek Cup win
Olympiacos
Home: Olympiacos – Panathinaikos 4–0, Karaiskakis Stadium, 13 April 1983 and Olympiacos – Panathinaikos 4–0, Karaiskakis Stadium, 16 January 2008
Away: Panathinaikos – Olympiacos 1–6, Apostolos Nikolaidis Stadium, 13 November 1932
Panathinaikos
Common field: Panathinaikos – Olympiacos 4–0, Athens Olympic Stadium, 28 May 1986
Home: Panathinaikos – Olympiacos 3–2, Apostolos Nikolaidis Stadium, 13 January 1982
Away: Olympiacos – Panathinaikos 2–3, Karaiskakis Stadium, 1 March 1995
Longest sequence of Alpha Ethniki wins
Olympiacos: 5, 8 December 1996 – 8 May 1999
Home: 4, 5 February 1966 – 11 May 1970
Away: 3, 6 April 1997 – 21 November 1999
Panathinaikos: 3, 11 April 1977 – 31 December 1978
Home: 2, 11 April 1977 – 12 February 1978
Away: 2, 11 May 1970 – 20 February 1972
Longest sequence of Greek Cup wins
Olympiacos: 3, 14 July 1965 – 9 July 1969 and 3 May 1953 – 7 August 1960
Home: 6, 26 March 1939 – 9 July 1969
Away: 2, 26 June 1966 – 21 July 1968 and 22 February 1995–present
Panathinaikos: 3, 8 June 1977 – 13 April 1983 and 6 February 1985 – 8 May 1988
Home: 4, 8 June 1977 – 4 April 1990
Away: 1
Longest sequence of unbeaten Alpha Ethniki matches
Olympiacos: 11, 11 May 1980 – 7 November 1985
Home: 10, 8 December 1996 – 4 March 2007
Away: 8, 2 November 1980 – 6 November 1988
Panathinaikos: 7, 8 November 1987 – 10 March 1991
Home: 7, 14 February 1960 – 6 November 1966
Away: 5, 8 November 1987 – 13 December 1992
Longest sequence of unbeaten Greek Cup matches
Olympiacos: 18, 13 November 1932 – 8 June 1977
Home: 10, 14 July 1965 – 20 February 1985
Away: 8, 13 November 1932 – 8 June 1977
Panathinaikos: 4, 6 February 1985 – 22 March 1990
home: 7, 8 June 1977 – 22 February 1995
away: 3, 11 March 1992 – 16 January 2008
Attendance records (in Athens Olympic Stadium)
74,452 Olympiacos – Panathinaikos 0–0, 18 November 1984
74,252 Olympiacos – Panathinaikos 2–1, 16 February 1987
74,146 Panathinaikos – Olympiacos 1–1, 31 March 1985
73,700 Panathinaikos – Olympiacos 1–2, 16 March 1986
73,525 Panathinaikos – Olympiacos 1–1, 20 September 1986

Matches list

Super League Greece (1959 – present)

1 Match suspended at 82nd minute (score: 3–2). Olympiacos were awarded a 2–0 win.
2 Match suspended at 82nd minute (score: 0–1). Olympiacos were awarded a 0–3 win.
3 Match suspended before the kick-off due to an outbreak of violence by Panathinaikos fans. Olympiacos were awarded a 0–3 win.
4 Match suspended at 70th minute (score: 0–1). Olympiacos were awarded a 0–3 win.

1st place play-off match – Title match

Greek Cup

1 Panathinaikos didn't show up in the match, due to a punishment because of fielding a suspended player.
• Series won: Olympiacos 19, Panathinaikos 9.

Greek League Cup

• Series won: Olympiacos 1, Panathinaikos 0.

Top scorers

1 Including League Cup games.

Penalties
Including all the Alpha Ethniki, Greek Cup and League Cup games since 1959–60.

Red cards
Including all the Alpha Ethniki, Greek Cup and League Cup games since 1959–60.

Head-to-head ranking in Super League Greece

• Total: Olympiacos 39 times higher, Panathinaikos 24 times higher.

Men in both teams

See also
Derby of the eternal enemies (basketball)

References

External links

Αιώνια... προϊστορία  
Η προϊστορία του ντέρμπι – Παναθηναϊκός, Ολυμπιακός – Contra.gr 
Footballderbies.com
History of the Rivalry
Αιώνια... προϊστορία 
The Rec.Sport.Soccer Statistics Foundation

Greece football derbies
Olympiacos F.C.
Panathinaikos F.C.